Graham George Williams (31 December 1936 – 25 November 2018) was a Welsh former footballer. A left-sided winger, he scored 47 goals in 249 league games in a 14-year career in the English Football League. He also won five senior caps for Wales in 1961.

He began his career with Wrexham and Oswestry Town, before moving to Everton via Bradford City in 1956. After three years on Merseyside he returned to Wales to play for Swansea Town. He returned to hometown club Wrexham in 1963, before joining Wellington Town in 1965. The next year he returned to the Football League with Tranmere Rovers. He helped the club to win promotion out of the Fourth Division in 1966–67, before he signed with Port Vale in July 1968. He joined Northern Premier League side Runcorn in May 1969, and later turned out for Oswestry Town.

Club career

Early career
Williams began his career in Welsh football with Wrexham and Oswestry Town, before he was signed by Bradford City manager Peter Jackson in August 1955. His two goals in eight Third Division North games in the 1955–56 season were enough to win him a move from Valley Parade to First Division side Everton in March 1956.

Everton
He made his Everton debut in a 2–1 defeat to Sunderland in March 1956. The "Toffees" struggled at the lower end of the table under the stewardship of Ian Buchan in 1956–57 and 1957–58, and showed little sign of improvement in the 1958–59 season under Johnny Carey. In his three years at Goodison Park, Williams scored six goals in 31 top-flight games.

Swansea City
In February 1959, Williams joined Second Division side Swansea Town for a £5,000 fee. Manager Trevor Morris said that "Some of Flicka's team-mates used to complain that they never knew what he would do with the ball. If they felt like that training with him every day, then what chance does the opposition have!" The "Swans" finished 12th in 1959–60, seventh in 1960–61, 20th in 1961–62, and 15th in 1962–63. He won the Welsh Cup with Swansea in 1961 following a 3–1 win over Bangor City in the final at Ninian Park. In four seasons at Vetch Field, Williams scored 20 goals in 89 league games before breaking his leg.

Later career
He then made a return to Wrexham in July 1964. Ken Barnes's "Dragons" were relegated out of the Third Division in 1963–64, and could only manage a 14th-place finish in the Fourth Division in 1964–65. Williams then left the Racecourse Ground for non-league side Wellington Town, who went on to finish 13th in the Premier Division of the Southern League in 1965–66. He signed with Tranmere Rovers in summer 1966. He helped Dave Russell's side to win promotion out of the Fourth Division in 1966–67. Williams remained at Prenton Park for the 1967–68 season, as the "Superwhites" finished three points above the relegation zone. Williams joined Fourth Division club Port Vale in July 1968. He scored one goal in 25 league and cup appearances in the 1968–69 season, before he was dropped by manager Gordon Lee in January 1969. He was given a free transfer away from Vale Park in May 1969, and moved on to Northern Premier League side Runcorn. He later moved on to Oswestry Town.

International career
Williams earned five Welsh caps in 1961, after playing at the under-23 and schoolboy levels.

Personal life
He was nicknamed 'Flicka', and a racehorse, Son of Flicka, was named after him. Following his football career, Williams worked as a carpenter. He was also an accomplished amateur golfer. He died suddenly on 25 November 2018, leaving behind wife Maureen.

Career statistics
Source:

Honours
Tranmere Rovers
Football League Fourth Division fourth-place promotion: 1966–67

References

1936 births
2018 deaths
Footballers from Wrexham
Welsh footballers
Wales international footballers
Wales under-23 international footballers
Association football wingers
Wrexham A.F.C. players
Oswestry Town F.C. players
Bradford City A.F.C. players
Everton F.C. players
Swansea City A.F.C. players
Telford United F.C. players
Tranmere Rovers F.C. players
Port Vale F.C. players
Runcorn F.C. Halton players
English Football League players
Southern Football League players
Northern Premier League players
British carpenters
A.F.C. Leopards managers